Demonarosa is a genus of moths in the family Limacodidae from Asia.

Species
Demonarosa diagonalis (Holloway, 1982)  (from Borneo, Peninsular Malaysia, Sumatra, Brunei)
Demonarosa mediodorsata   (Hering, 1931)  (from Sundaland: Brunei, Sarawak)
Demonarosa nocturnignis  Holloway, 1990 (from Sumatra)
Demonarosa ochrirubra  (Holloway, 1976) (from Borneo)
Demonarosa rufotessellata  (Moore, 1879) (from Borneo, India, Laos, Vietnam, Philippines)
Demonarosa rufotessellata subrosea (Wileman, 1915) (from Taiwan)
Demonarosa rufotessellata issiki (Kawazoe & Ogata, 1962) (from Japan)

References
Matsumura, 1931 . Insecta matsum. 5 : 105.

External links
boldsystems.org: images of species of this genus

Limacodidae genera
Limacodidae
Taxa named by Shōnen Matsumura